Rajská zahrada is a Prague Metro station on Line B. It was opened on 8 November 1998 as part of the extension of Line B from Českomoravská to Černý Most. The station was designed by Patrik Kotas.

It has an unorthodox platform design, where trains in each direction are on a different level with the westbound platform being directly above the eastbound track. Due to its unique architectural design, Rajská zahrada was named the Czech Construction of the Year for 1999.

Gallery

References

Prague Metro stations
Railway stations opened in 1998
1998 establishments in the Czech Republic
Railway stations in the Czech Republic opened in the 20th century